Mohammed Khisar Paika ( born on 27 August 1979) is an American singer, songwriter, composer and physician. He is also the Founder and Director of One Essence Productions, a record label company that provides Pop, R&B, Spiritual and World music to millions of people worldwide.

Early Life and Career 
Paika was born in Bombay, India and his family immigrated to the United States when he was 6 years old. His music career started with Eastern and Western musical influences which helped shape his singing style and performances. He composed his first song at the age of 19. In 1996, he completed a degree in computer engineering. He released his first spiritual based a cappella album which was named Sounds of Reverence in 2003. In 2003, he went on to pursue his medical degree. During the years of 2003–2008, he served as a Cantor while in med school.

In 2017 he set up One Essence Productions and released his first solo a cappella album - The Most Merciful. In 2018 he had released his first solo music-based album "Unity". In early 2018, his first single "So Many Divisions" was released on Vevo which got over 1 million views and earned him numerous film awards and nominations for best music video. Since then, Paika passionately speaks of the various social and religious issues facing humanity through his music. In the future, he wants to make history in the music industry with his unique brand of self-expression. Mohammed believes that living a spiritual life means living a life of self-awareness. His progress toward making a significant impact on the world through his music company has been phenomenal. 

One Essence Productions

Paika is the Founder and Director of One Essence Productions, a record label company that provides Pop, R&B, Spiritual and World music to millions of people worldwide. As the Founder, he provides leadership and strategic direction for the business, creates, implements, and executes the company's vision and mission, and ensures the financial success and public acceptance of the corporate brand.

“So Many Divisions”
Paika’s music video “So Many Divisions” speaks about the various sects within the Islamic religion and alludes that all religions essentially believe in the same God. The prime focus of the song is to enlighten humanity towards unification “So Many Divisions” has won the best music video award at the New York Film Awards and also The Peace Award at the California Music Video Awards in addition to numerous other awards and nominations.

“Oh My Nation”

The hard facts are very clear – the vast majority of the world's Muslims are completely opposed to groups like ISIS and other radicals. To help raise awareness of this fact Paika’s album “Unity is project completely devoted to opposing radicalism, ISIS and fellow travelers, through the strength and beauty of the true spirit of Islam. His music video “Oh My Nation" has won Best Music Video at the Festigious International Film Festival , and was officially selected at the Global Film Festival Awards. “Oh My Nation” has also received numerous other awards and nominations.

“Purpose of Life”

Paika’s music video “Purpose of Life" highlights life's true purpose which includes caring, sharing, helping and loving one another. It is a call to respect each other regardless of race, culture, religion or education. “Purpose of Life” has won numerous awards including the Grand Jury Award for Best Music Video at the New York International Film Festival, Best music Video at the Festigious International Film Festival as well as the Top Shorts Film Awards. “Purpose of Life” was a Nominee at the Cannes World Film Festival and has also received the “Best Song Award” at the New York Film Awards.

Covid-19 Initiative  

Paika took the fight against the covid-19 to the next level with his music video “Stronger". The video was directed towards creating awareness about covid-19 and urges everyone to adhere to preventive measures in order to curb the spread of the pandemic. , "Stronger" has won Best Music Video at the 8 & Half Film Awards and the Rome Movie Awards and has been nominated for numerous other awards.

Professional Career

Paika has completed a Bachelor of Science, Computer Engineering from the University of New Mexico and worked as a Software Engineer for Honeywell Defense Avionics Systems. He was also a Software Engineer for IBM. He has been a research Assistant at Sandia Labs in New Mexico and also has also been part of a Research project for Nasa Pursue. He went on to pursue his medical degree from Ross University School of Medicine and Residency in Internal Medicine at Albany Medical Center in New York. He currently works in the field of Internal Medicine.

Initiatives 

In August 2019, Mohammed hosted the Open Mic and Karaoke Talent Search in Garland, Texas. In September 2019, Mohammed performed at the APPNA event which also featured Ali Pervez Mehdi. In 2021 Mohammed collaborated with Pakistani Classical Singer Hisham Faisal Siddique. Mohammed’s single "Mere Khuda” received close to a million views on youtube.

Awards and Nominations 
So Many Divisions

O My Nation (Ya Ummati)

Purpose of Life

Stronger

Albums

Music Videos

References 

Living people
1979 births